The 1898–99 Welsh Amateur Cup was the ninth season of the Welsh Amateur Cup. The cup was won by Oswestry United Reserves who defeated Shrewsbury based team Singleton & Coles 1-0 in the final, at Welshpool.

Preliminary round

First round

Second round

Third round

Semi-final

Final

References

1898-99
Welsh Cup
1898–99 domestic association football cups